In Indian religions, Darshana, also spelt Darshan, (Sanskrit: दर्शन) or Darshanam (darśanam) is the auspicious sight of a deity or a holy person. 

The term also refers to six traditional schools of Hindu philosophy and their literature on spirituality and soteriology.

Etymology
The word darshana, also in the forms of darśana or darshanam, comes from Sanskrit दर्शन, from dṛś, 'to see', vision, apparition or glimpse.

Definition
Darshana is described as an "auspicious sight" of a holy person, which bestows merit on the viewer.

It is most commonly used for theophany, meaning a manifestation or vision of the divine, in Hindu worship, e.g. of a deity (especially in image form), or a very holy person or artifact. One can receive darshana or a glimpse of the deity in the temple, or from a great saintly person, such as a great guru.

In Hinduism
The term darshana also refers to the six systems of thought, called darshanam, that comprise classical Hindu philosophy. The term therein implies how each of these six systems distinctively look at things and the scriptures in Indian philosophies. The six orthodox Hindu darshana are Nyaya, Vaisheshika, Samkhya, Yoga, Mīmāṃsā, and Vedanta. Buddhism and Jainism are examples of non-Hindu darshans.

Mahayana Buddhism 

On the significance of darshana in Mahayana thought, Paul Harrison writes: "By the second century CE... the vision of the Buddha (buddha-darśana) and the accompanying hearing of the Dharma (dharma-śravaṇa) are represented as a transformation experience of decisive importance for practitioners, be they who have renounced (mundane life) 'ascetics' or householders."

The Abhidharma, collections of systematic summaries of the sutras, mention Darshana-citta, i.e. visions.

Indian Mahayana philosophers Vasubandhu and Asanga acknowledged five paths to liberation, of which the third is darshana-marga, the "path of seeing".

Nagarjuna, a prominent philosopher of the Madhyamaka school of Mahayana Buddhism, wrote that the wise person perceives tattva-darshana, true reality.

Other meanings
Darshana also sometimes has a more mundane meaning. For example, Sivananda Saraswati wrote in his book The Practice of Brahmacharya that one of the eight aspects of brahmacharya (celibacy) is not to look lustfully at women: "You should carefully avoid ... Darshana or looking at women with passionate resolve".

Scholar of religion Richard H. Davis has said that darshana (viewpoint, philosophical school) is one of three terms in classical Indian discourse that could be considered roughly analogous to what today's English-speakers understand as "religion." The other two terms are dharma (duty, morality, a code of proper conduct) and marga (route, spiritual path). According to Davis, "most Hindu texts accepted that religious paths (marga) are relative to the points of view (darśana) and moral responsibilities (dharma) of practitioners, whose individual circumstances may make one or another course of action more appropriate in their particular situations."

Poet Gary Snyder has given a naturalistic meaning to darshana:

See also

 Blessing
 Dharma transmission
 Guru–shishya tradition
 Jharokha Darshan
 Pranāma

References

Citations

Works cited

Further reading

 

Buddhist devotion
Hindu philosophical concepts
Rituals in Hindu worship
Spiritual gifts